In the New Testament, Salome was a follower of Jesus who appears briefly in the canonical gospels and in apocryphal writings. She is named by Mark as present at the crucifixion and as one of the Myrrhbearers, the women who found Jesus's empty tomb. Interpretation has further identified her with other women who are mentioned but not named in the canonical gospels. In particular, she is often identified as the wife of Zebedee, the mother of James and John, two of the Twelve apostles. In medieval tradition Salome (as Mary Salome) was counted as one of the Three Marys who were daughters of Saint Anne, so making her the sister or half-sister of Mary, mother of Jesus.

Name
"Salome" may be the Hellenized form of a Hebrew name derived from the root word  (shalom), meaning "peace".

The name was a common one; apart from the famous dancing "daughter of Herodias", both a sister and daughter of Herod the Great were called Salome, as well as Queen Salome Alexandra (d. 67 BC), the last independent ruler of Judea.

In the canonical gospels

In Mark , Salome is named as one of the women present at the crucifixion who also ministered to Jesus: "There were also women looking on afar off: among whom was Mary Magdalene, and Mary the mother of James and of Joses; and Salome who also followed Him and ministered to Him when he was in Galilee. And many other women who followed Him to Jerusalem."(King James Version) The parallel passage of Matthew  reads thus: "Among which was Mary Magdalene, and Mary the mother of James and Joses, and the mother of Zebedee's children." The Catholic Encyclopedia (1913) concludes that the Salome of Mark 15:40 is probably identical with the mother of the sons of Zebedee in Matthew; the latter is also mentioned in Matthew 20:20, in which she petitions Jesus to let her sons sit with him in Paradise.

In John, three, or perhaps four, women are mentioned at the crucifixion; this time they are named as Jesus' "mother, and his mother's sister, Mary the wife of Cleophas, and Mary Magdalene." (John  KJV) A common interpretation identifies Salome as the sister of Jesus' mother, thus making her Jesus' aunt. Traditional interpretations associate Mary the wife of Cleophas (the third woman in the Gospel of John) with Mary the mother of James son of Alphaeus (the third woman in the Gospel of Matthew).

In the Gospel of Mark, Salome is among the women who went to Jesus' tomb to anoint his body with spices. "And when the sabbath was past, Mary Magdalene, and Mary the mother of James, and Salome, had bought sweet spices, that they might come and anoint him." (Mark  KJV) They discovered that the stone had been rolled away, and a young man in white then told them that Jesus had risen, and told them to tell Jesus' disciples that he would meet them in Galilee. In Matthew 28:1, two women are mentioned in the parallel passage: Mary Magdalene and the "other Mary" identified previously in Matthew 27:56 as Mary the mother of James and Joses.

The canonical gospels never go so far as to label Salome a "disciple" ("pupil" mathētēs), and so mainstream Christian writers usually describe her as a "follower" of Jesus per references to the women who "followed" and "ministered" to Jesus (Mark 15:41). However, feminist critiques have argued that the mainstream tradition consistently underplays the significance of Jesus's female supporters.

In non-canonical works

The Gospel of Thomas found at Nag Hammadi mentions among the "disciples" of Jesus (the Greek expression "apostles" does not appear) two women, Salome and Mary Magdalene (referred to simply as "Mary", The name might also denote Salome's mother Mary , the sister of Elizabeth and Anne who is the mother of Christ's mother Mary. Thus Salome's mother Mary  would be Jesus' great aunt, the sister of his grandmother Anne and aunt of his mother.)

The Diatessaron, which is part of the Ante-Nicene Fathers collection, separates Salome and the mother of the sons of Zebedee as two distinct persons, contrary to tradition that identify them. "And there were in the distance all the acquaintance of Jesus standing, and the women that came with Him from Galilee, those that followed Him and ministered. One of them was Mary Magdalene; and Mary the mother of James the little and Joses, and the mother of the sons of Zebedee, and Salome, and many others which came up with Him unto Jerusalem." (Diatessaron 52:21–23)

The controversial Secret Gospel of Mark, that was referred to and quoted in the Mar Saba letter ascribed by his modern editors to Clement of Alexandria, contains a further mention of Salome which is not present in the canonical Mark at 10:46. Clement quotes the passage in his letter: "Then he came into Jericho. And the sister of the young man whom Jesus loved was there with his mother and Salome, but Jesus would not receive them." The lines complete a well-known lacuna in Mark as the text currently stands.

In the non-canonical Greek Gospel of the Egyptians (2nd century), Salome appears again as a disciple of Jesus. She asks him how long death would hold sway, and he says to her, "So long as women bring forth, for I come to end the works of the female." To this Salome replies, "Then I have done well in not bringing forth." It would appear from this text that there was an early tradition that Salome the disciple was childless, and possibly unmarried.

In the Gospel of Thomas there is a reference to Jesus reclining on a couch and eating at a table that belonged to Salome and being asked by her: "Who are you sir, that you have taken your place on my couch and eaten from my table?" Jesus answers: "I am he who is from the One, and the things that belong to the Father have been given to me." Salome replies, "But I am your disciple", and Jesus answers, "When the disciple is united he will be filled with light, but if he is divided he will be filled with darkness."

A 2nd-century Greek, Celsus, wrote a True Discourse attacking the Christian sects as a threat to the Roman state. He described the variety of Christian sects at the time he was writing, c. AD 178, as extremely broad. His treatise is lost, but quotes survive in the attack written somewhat later by Origen, Contra Celsum ("Against Celsus"): "While some of the Christians proclaim [that] they have the same god as do the Jews, others insist that there is another god higher than the creator-god and opposed to him. And some Christians teach that the Son came from this higher god. Still others admit of a third god – those, that is to say, who call themselves gnostics – and still others, though calling themselves Christians, want to live according to the laws of the Jews. I could also mention those who call themselves Simonians after Simon, and those naming themselves Helenians after Helen, his consort. There are Christian sects named after Marcellina, Harpocratian Christians who trace themselves to Salome, and some who follow Mariamne and others who follow Martha, and still others who call themselves Marcionites after their leader, Marcion."

In the early Christian texts, there are several other references to "Salome". A Salome appears in the infancy gospel attached to the name of James the Just, the Protevangelion of James, ch. XIV:
"14 And the midwife went out from the cave, and Salome met her. 15 And the midwife said to her, "Salome, Salome, I will tell you a most surprising thing, which I saw. 16 A virgin has brought forth, which is a thing contrary to nature." 17 To which Salome replied, "As the Lord my God lives, unless I receive particular proof of this matter, I will not believe that a virgin has brought forth."

18 Then Salome went in, and the midwife said, "Mary, show yourself, for a great controversy has arisen about you." 19 And Salome tested her with her finger. 20 But her hand was withered, and she groaned bitterly, 21 and said, "Woe to me, because of my iniquity! For I have tempted the living God, and my hand is ready to drop off."

That Salome is the first, after the midwife, to bear witness to the Miraculous Birth and to recognize Jesus as the Christ, are circumstances that tend to connect her with Salome the disciple. By the High Middle Ages this Salome was often (but not always) identified with Mary Salome in the West, and therefore regarded as the believing midwife.

An apocryphal Coptic Book of the Resurrection of Christ, attributed to the apostle Bartholomew, names the women who went to the tomb. Among them were: Mary Magdalene; Mary the mother of James, whom Jesus delivered out of the hand of Satan; Mary who ministered to him; Martha her sister; Joanna (perhaps also Susanna) who renounced the marriage bed; and "Salome 
who tempted him".

Sainthood
Saint Salome is commemorated in the Eastern Orthodox Church on the Sunday of the Myrrhbearers, i.e., the third Sunday of Pascha (Easter), and on 3 August.

Her feast day in the Latin liturgical rites of the Catholic Church is 24 April or 22 October.

In the Calendar of Saints of the Lutheran Church–Missouri Synod, her feast is on 3 August with Joanna and Mary.

In art, she is often portrayed with the Holy Family in paintings of the Holy Kinship. She is also portrayed holding a thurible as a symbol of her sacrifice and faith in Jesus Christ.

Legend of Saint Anne's three husbands
According to a legend propounded by Haymo of Auxerre in the mid-9th century, but rejected by the Council of Trent, Saint Anne had, by different husbands, three daughters, all of whom bore the name Mary and who are referred to as the Three Marys:
 Mary, the mother of Jesus
 Mary of Clopas
 Salome, in this tradition called Mary Salome (as in the tradition of the three Marys at the tomb)

Mary Magdalene is not part of this group. Mary Salome thus becomes the half-sister of the Virgin Mary.

This account was included in the Golden Legend of Jacobus de Voragine, written in about 1260. It was the subject of a long poem in rhymed French written in about 1357 by Jean de Venette. The poem is preserved in a mid-15th-century manuscript on vellum containing 232 pages written in columns. The titles are in red and illuminated in gold. It is decorated with seven miniatures in monochrome gray.

For some centuries, religious art throughout Germany and the Low Countries frequently presented Saint Anne with her husbands, daughters, sons-in-law and grandchildren as a group known as the Holy Kinship. During the Reformation the idea of the three husbands was rejected by Protestants, and by the Council of Trent by Catholic theologians also, but Salome continued to be regarded as probably the sister of the Virgin Mary, and the wife of Zebedee, and mother of the two apostles. The Catholic Encyclopedia of 1913 said (rather more cautiously than leading 19th-century Protestant books of biblical reference) that "some writers conjecture more or less plausibly that she is the sister of the Blessed Virgin mentioned in John 19:25".

See also
 Holy Kinship
 Mary Salome and Zebedee
 Myrrhbearers
 Saint Sarah
 Salome (Gospel of James)

References

Citations

Sources

External links 
 

1st-century Christian female saints
Christian saints from the New Testament
Family of Jesus
Followers of Jesus
Gospel of Mark
Saints from the Holy Land
Women in the New Testament
Myrrhbearers
The Three Marys